Tod Hartje (born February 27, 1968 in Anoka, Minnesota) is a retired ice hockey center.  Hartje was the first North American trained player to play in the Soviet Championship League in 1990 with Sokil Kyiv.  He would also play for several teams in the American Hockey League, International Hockey League and East Coast Hockey League.

Career statistics

References

External links

1968 births
Living people
Adirondack Red Wings players
American men's ice hockey centers
Atlanta Knights players
Dayton Bombers players
Fort Wayne Komets players
Harvard Crimson men's ice hockey players
Minnesota Moose players
Moncton Hawks players
Nashville Knights players
Providence Bruins players
Sokil Kyiv players
Toledo Storm players
Winnipeg Jets (1979–1996) draft picks
American expatriate sportspeople in the Soviet Union
NCAA men's ice hockey national champions